Kasam Bapu Tirmizi was an Indian politician of the Indian National Congress. He was elected twice from the Gandhinagar constituency of the Gujarat Legislative Assembly in 1980 and 1990.

References 

2016 deaths
Indian National Congress politicians from Gujarat